Donald "Mark" Seale (born March 10, 1960, in Halifax, Nova Scotia) is a former professional Canadian football defensive lineman who played seven seasons in the Canadian Football League for three teams.

Seale was selected as a territorial exemption by the Ottawa Rough Riders in the 1982 CFL Draft.  He was also the 12th round selection of the New York Giants in the 1982 NFL Draft.

Seale attended Sir Wilfrid Laurier Secondary School in Ottawa, Ontario, where he lettered in both hockey and football.  He also played for the Ottawa Sooners for two seasons before attending the University of Richmond in Virginia, where he earned a Bachelor of Arts degree in 1982.

References

External links 
 Mark Seale trading card
 Faculty - Graduate School of Retail Bank Management

1960 births
Living people
Players of Canadian football from Nova Scotia
Sportspeople from Halifax, Nova Scotia
Canadian players of American football
Richmond Spiders football players
Ottawa Rough Riders players
Toronto Argonauts players
Winnipeg Blue Bombers players